= Retro Review =

Retro Review, a retro computing magazine, was the first multiformat magazine dedicated to old computers. It was irregularly published between January 2002 and March 2004.

== History ==
It was founded by Jorge Canelhas and Ian Gledhill who also edited and published the magazine. The first issue was published on 15 January 2002. It was a 60-page A5 magazine with a colour cover and was photocopied. Beginning on 21 January 2003, Retro Review was produced as a PDF file for subscribers in addition to print edition. On 15 March 2004, the magazine published its fifth and final issue.
